Durak Qanbari (also Romanized as Dūrak Qanbarī; also known as Dūrak-e Qanbar and Dūrak Qanbar) is a village in Shalil Rural District, Miankuh District, Ardal County, Chaharmahal and Bakhtiari Province, Iran. At the 2006 census, its population was 807, in 142 families. The village is populated by Lurs.

References 

Populated places in Ardal County
Luri settlements in Chaharmahal and Bakhtiari Province